Caio Roberto Freire Mendes (born 1 June 1986) is a Brazilian footballer who plays for Grêmio Barueri as a defender. He is the brother of Daniel Mendes.

References

External links

1986 births
Living people
Association football defenders
Brazilian footballers
Brazilian expatriate footballers
Allsvenskan players
Superettan players
Sociedade Esportiva Palmeiras players
Associação Atlética Internacional (Limeira) players
Mirassol Futebol Clube players
Nacional Futebol Clube players
Uberlândia Esporte Clube players
Marília Atlético Clube players
Grêmio Barueri Futebol players
IFK Norrköping players
IK Brage players
Expatriate footballers in Sweden
Footballers from São Paulo